Peter Kane (born 4 April 1939) is a Scottish former professional footballer who played as an inside left.

Club career
Born in Glasgow, Kane played throughout Scotland and England for a number of clubs including Petershill, Hamilton Academical, Stirling Albion, Queen's Park, Northampton Town, Arsenal, Crewe Alexandra, St Mirren, Clydebank, Barrow, Albion Rovers and Vale of Leven.

Representative career 
Kane made one friendly appearance for Great Britain, scoring a hattrick in a 7–3 win over a Caribbean XI on 10 October 1959.

References

External links

Arsenal F.C. profile

1939 births
Living people
Scottish footballers
Petershill F.C. players
Hamilton Academical F.C. players
Stirling Albion F.C. players
Queen's Park F.C. players
Northampton Town F.C. players
Arsenal F.C. players
Crewe Alexandra F.C. players
St Mirren F.C. players
Clydebank F.C. (1965) players
Barrow A.F.C. players
Albion Rovers F.C. players
Vale of Leven F.C. players
Scottish Football League players
English Football League players
Footballers from Glasgow
Association football inside forwards